Begnas Lake is a freshwater lake in Pokhara Metropolis of Kaski district of Nepal located in the south-east of the Pokhara Valley. The lake is the third largest lake of Nepal and second largest, after Phewa Lake, among the eight lakes in Pokhara Valley. Water level in the lake fluctuates seasonally due to rain, and utilization for irrigation. The water level is regulated through a dam constructed in 1988 on the western outlet stream, Khudi Khola.

Lake Economy
Begnas Lake area with a number of resorts is a popular destination for tourists visiting Pokhara. The water from the lake is used for irrigation and some parts of the lake are used as caged fisheries. The Begnas lake area has a number of swampy areas around it, many of which have been converted to paddy fields. Annapurna and Manaslu Range can be seen very clearly from the lake.

Other Attractions 

 Rupa Lake
 Begnas Yoga & Retreat
 Rupa-Begnas view Tower
 Pachhabhiya Deurali Temple
 Majhikuna
 Sundari Danda
 Gorakhnath Temple
 International Zoological park of Pokhara
 Begnas Highest Cote
 Hotel Rupa Begnas Lake Inn
Sanu Lake On D Water

Gallery

References

External links

Begnas Fish Festival 
 Photos | Begnas Lake
Yoga at Begnas Lake

Lakes of Gandaki Province

Lakes of Nepal